Ehsan Zaffar is a civil rights advocate, educator and policymaker and the founder of the Los Angeles Mobile Legal Aid Clinic (LAMLAC), which helped to pioneer the delivery of mobile legal care to vulnerable populations in California and across the nation.

Zaffar primarily studies issues related to inequality and equity, and most recently the disparate impact of national and homeland security laws and policies on protected classes and other minority communities with a particular emphasis on Establishment Clause and First Amendment (religious freedom) limitations surrounding security, privacy, and law enforcement. He serves as Senior Advisor on civil rights at the United States Department of Homeland Security. He is a member of the faculty at George Washington University's Graduate School of Political Management and the Washington College of Law at American University and author of Understanding Homeland Security: Foundations of Security Policy.

In 2016, he joined General (Ret.) David Petraeus as a member of the board of Team Rubicon. Zaffar is a Council Member of Chatham House at the Royal Institute of International Affairs, the Council on Foreign Relations, and the Pacific Council on International Policy. He is the recipient of the U.S. State Department's Benjamin Franklin Award for Public Diplomacy and the Department of Homeland Security Secretary's Award for Excellence.

Zaffar serves as a visiting fellow at the University of Southern California’s Sol Price School of Public Policy where his scholarly work focuses on social, political and economic inequality and he is also a Senior Scholar (non-resident) at the University of California, Berkeley. 

In 2021 he was appointed by Arizona State University President Michael M. Crow to lead an initiative to study ways to reduce social, political and economic inequality in the United States. He has teaching appointments at ASU's Sandra Day O'Connor College of Law and the School of Social Transformation at ASU.

He hosts UnfairNation, a podcast on inequality. The first several episodes featured guests Dr. Thomas Nolan of the Boston Police Department and Nick Martin of TechChange, among others.

References

External links
 

George Washington University faculty
Year of birth missing (living people)
Living people
Arizona State University faculty